Time Bomb is the second studio album by American rock band Buckcherry. It was produced by John Travis  and released on March 27, 2001, by DreamWorks Records. It is the band's first album as a five-piece as guitarist Yogi Lonich joined the band. It is the only album to feature him and is the last album to feature the original lineup, as drummer Devon Glenn and bassist Jonathan Brightman both departed the group after its release. It is also their final release on Dreamworks.

Release and reception
The album spawned two singles, "Ridin'" and "Slit My Wrists". The lyrics are sleazier and more sordid than on the band's first album, suggesting considerable rock n' roll excess within the band at the time. The bonus track (untitled on the sleeve, but officially called "Open My Eyes") suggests an end to this due to a successful relationship. The CD version of the album is currently out of print as of June 2010, though iTunes and Spotify still feature the album in their libraries.

Track listing

Personnel 
 Josh Todd – vocals
 Keith Nelson – lead guitar
 Yogi Lonich – rhythm guitar, backing vocals
 Jonathan "J.B." Brightman – bass
 Devon Glenn – drums, percussion

Cover versions
In 2011, grindcore band Anal Cunt covered the song "Whiskey in the Morning" for an EP that has since been deleted from Bandcamp and has been re-uploaded to YouTube. The song was a favorite of Anal Cunt frontman Seth Putnam.

References

Buckcherry albums
2001 albums
DreamWorks Records albums